For the common use of RF induction process of heating a metal object by electromagnetic induction, see induction heating

Radio-frequency induction or RF induction is the use of a radio frequency magnetic field to transfer energy by means of electromagnetic induction in the near field. A radio-frequency alternating current is passed through a coil of wire that acts as the transmitter, and a second coil or conducting object, magnetically coupled to the first coil, acts as the receiver.

See also
 Radio-frequency identification (RFID)
 Radio antenna 
 Electromagnetic radiation 
 Electromagnetic induction 
 Induction plasma technology
 List of electronics topics 
 List of radiation topics
 Transformer

External articles
 Budyansky, A. and A. Zykov, "Static current-voltage characteristics for radio-frequencyinduction discharge".  Plasma Science, 1995. IEEE Conference Record - Abstracts., 1995 Page(s):146  
 IBM Research Division, T. J. Watson Research Center, Yorktown Heights, New York 10598. 
 Maurizio Vignati and Livio Giuliani "Radiofrequency Exposure Near High-voltage Lines". 
 Tenforde, T. S., and W. T. Kaune, "Interaction of extremely low frequency electric and magnetic fields with humans". Health Phys 53(6):585-606 (1987).

Radio electronics